Basil Ince (born 1 May 1933) is a former sprinter from Trinidad and Tobago.
At the 1958 British Empire and Commonwealth Games, Ince represented Trinidad and Tobago in the 440 yards relay, the 440 yards and the 220 yards. He was most successful in the 440 yards, where he cames second in his heat before narrowly being eliminated in the quarterfinals.
The following year, Ince represented the British West Indies at the 1959 Pan American Games, participating in the 200 metres, 400 metres, and 4x400 metres relay. He won silver in the 400 metres, and took gold as part of the successful relay team.

References

1933 births
Living people
Place of birth missing (living people)
Trinidad and Tobago male sprinters
Athletes (track and field) at the 1958 British Empire and Commonwealth Games
Athletes (track and field) at the 1959 Pan American Games
Pan American Games gold medalists for the British West Indies
Pan American Games silver medalists for the British West Indies
Pan American Games medalists in athletics (track and field)
Medalists at the 1959 Pan American Games
Commonwealth Games competitors for Trinidad and Tobago